The Master and Servant Act 1823 was an Act of Parliament of the United Kingdom. It sought to codify the general use of penal sanctions for breach of contract by workers against their employers.

References

See also
Master and Servant Act

United Kingdom Acts of Parliament 1823
Repealed United Kingdom Acts of Parliament